Andrew "Jay" Billow, Jr. (February 5, 1924 – November 16, 2003) was a Democratic member of the Pennsylvania House of Representatives.

References

Democratic Party members of the Pennsylvania House of Representatives
1924 births
2003 deaths
20th-century American politicians